The 1st Großer Preis von Berlin was a non-championship Formula One motor race held on 19 September 1954 at the AVUS circuit in Berlin. The Grand Prix was won by Karl Kling in a Mercedes-Benz W196. Kling's team-mates Juan Manuel Fangio and Hans Herrmann were second and third, with Fangio setting pole position and fastest lap.

This was Mercedes' only participation in a non-championship Formula 1 race, the team wanting to demonstrate their cars to their home nation, especially on a track that would suit them. As such it was a processional race, with less than a second separating the three cars, and fourth placed André Pilette coming in 3 laps behind in his Gordini T16.

Classification

Race

References

Berlin